The 2018–19 season was Ipswich Town's 17th consecutive season in the second tier of English football and 141st year in existence. Along with competing in the Championship, the club also participated in the FA Cup, going out in the third round, and League Cup, in which they were eliminated in the first round.

The season covers the period from 1 July 2018 to 30 June 2019.

Kits
Supplier: Adidas / Sponsor: Magical Vegas (chest), East Anglian Children's Hospices (back), Nicholas Estates (shorts)

First-team squad

Left club during season

First-team coaching staff
Until 25 October:

From 27 October:

Pre-season
A pre-season friendly with Milton Keynes Dons was announced on 17 May 2018. Further matches with Braintree Town and Crawley Town were announced a day later.

Competitions

EFL Championship

League table

Results summary

Results by matchday

Matches

FA Cup

The third round draw was made live on BBC by Ruud Gullit and Paul Ince from Stamford Bridge on 3 December 2018.

EFL Cup

On 15 June 2018, the draw for the first round was made in Vietnam.

Transfers

Transfers in

Loans in

Transfers out

Loans out

Squad statistics
All statistics updated as of end of season

Appearances and goals

|-
! colspan=14 style=background:#dcdcdc; text-align:center| Goalkeepers

|-
! colspan=14 style=background:#dcdcdc; text-align:center| Defenders

|-
! colspan=14 style=background:#dcdcdc; text-align:center| Midfielders

|-
! colspan=14 style=background:#dcdcdc; text-align:center| Forwards

|-
! colspan=14 style=background:#dcdcdc; text-align:center| Players transferred out during the season

Goalscorers

Assists

Clean sheets

Disciplinary record

Starting 11
Considering starts in all competitions

Awards

Player awards

EFL Championship Goal of the Month

References

Ipswich Town
Ipswich Town F.C. seasons